This is a list of African Americans who were killed by police while unarmed. 



Before 2000

2000-2009

2010-2013

2014

2015

2016

2017

2018

2019

2020

2021

2022

2023

References

Law enforcement controversies in the United States
Race and crime in the United States